Box 2000 was a regular community broadcasting slot provided by Scottish Television (STV) from the late 1980s until the millennium, around 1993 it was renamed, Action 2000.

The Box 2000 slots would advertise local community groups and charities within the STV broadcasting area.  Typically, they lasted up to one minute and were shown within advertising breaks or during continuity announcements.

Box 2000 was regularly lampooned (in a similar manner to many other STV programmes such as Late Call) by the BBC Scotland comedy sketch show Scotch and Wry, where it took on the name Box 2001, and instead had bizarre charities which generally poked fun at genuine ones shown on the real broadcasts.

Television shows produced by Scottish Television
Television shows set in Scotland